al-Armani is a nisba meaning "Armenian" or from the region of Armenia. It may refer to:

Abu Salih Al-Armani, priest of the Coptic Orthodox Church of Alexandria
Ali ibn Yahya al-Armani, Abbasid general
Bahram al-Armani, vizier of the Fatimid Caliphate
Muhammad ibn Ali al-Armani, Abbasid general
Yuhanna al-Armani ( 1720–1786), artist in Ottoman period

Nisbas
Ethnonymic surnames